Gurahonț is a commune in Arad County, Romania. It is composed of ten villages: Bonțești (Boncesd), Dulcele (Dulcsele), Feniș (Körösfényes), Gurahonț, Honțișor (Honcisor), Iosaș (Jószás), Mustești (Musztesd), Pescari (Holdmézes), Valea Mare (Valemáre) and Zimbru (Zombrád).

Iosășel (Jószáshely) village existed for several centuries until 1968, when it was absorbed by Gurahonț.

References

Communes in Arad County
Localities in Crișana